In mathematics, the nth-term test for divergence is a simple test for the divergence of an infinite series:If  or if the limit does not exist, then  diverges.Many authors do not name this test or give it a shorter name.

When testing if a series converges or diverges, this test is often checked first due to its ease of use.

In the case of p-adic analysis the term test is a necessary and sufficient condition for convergence due to the non-archimedean triangle inequality.

Usage 

Unlike stronger convergence tests, the term test cannot prove by itself that a series converges. In particular, the converse to the test is not true; instead all one can say is:If  then  may or may not converge. In other words, if  the test is inconclusive.The harmonic series is a classic example of a divergent series whose terms limit to zero. The more general class of p-series,

exemplifies the possible results of the test:
 If p ≤ 0, then the term test identifies the series as divergent.
 If 0 < p ≤ 1, then the term test is inconclusive, but the series is divergent by the integral test for convergence.
 If 1 < p, then the term test is inconclusive, but the series is convergent, again by the integral test for convergence.

Proofs
The test is typically proven in contrapositive form:If  converges, then

Limit manipulation
If sn are the partial sums of the series, then the assumption that the series
converges means that

for some number L. Then

Cauchy's criterion
The assumption that the series converges means that it passes Cauchy's convergence test: for every  there is a number N such that

holds for all n > N and p ≥ 1. Setting p = 1 recovers the definition of the statement

Scope
The simplest version of the term test applies to infinite series of real numbers. The above two proofs, by invoking the Cauchy criterion or the linearity of the limit, also work in any other normed vector space  (or any (additively written) abelian group).

Notes

References
 
 
 
 
 
 

Convergence tests
Articles containing proofs